A river is a flowing body of water.

River may also refer to:

Places
River, Indiana, former name of San Pierre, US
River, Kent, a village and civil parish in Kent, England
River, West Sussex, a hamlet in England
River Township, Red Lake County, Minnesota, US

People
 Dylan River, Australian filmmaker 
 Jack River (musician) (born Holly Rankin, 1991), Australian singer-songwriter
 River Cracraft (born 1994), American football player
 River Jones (born 1977), American musician
 River Phoenix (1970–1993), American actor

Arts, entertainment, and media

Films and television
River (2007 film), a Canadian film by Mark Wihak
River (2011 film), a Japanese film
River (2015 Canadian film), a Canadian film by Jamie M. Dagg
River (2015 Tibetan film), a Tibetan film
River (TV series), a British television series
River, a 2022 Australian film by Jennifer Peedom

Music

Albums
 River (Izzy Stradlin album), 2001
 River (Terry Reid album)
 River: The Joni Letters, a 2007 album by Herbie Hancock
 River, a Japanese-language album by Hound Dog
 River (EP), an EP by Coby Sey

Songs
"River" (Joni Mitchell song), 1971, covered by Ellie Goulding in 2019
"River" (Dragon song), 1988
"River" (AKB48 song), 2009
"River" (Bishop Briggs song), 2016
"River" (Eminem song), 2017
"River" (Krystian Ochman song), 2022
"River" (Pnau and Ladyhawke song), 2020
"River" (Miley Cyrus song), 2023
"River", by Gentle Giant from Octopus
"River", by Badger from One Live Badger
"River", by Enya from Watermark
"River", by Lights from The Listening
"River", by Grimes from Halfaxa
"River", by Emeli Sandé from Our Version of Events
"River", by Ibeyi from Ibeyi
"River", by Leon Bridges from Coming Home
"River", by Akron/Family from Set 'Em Wild, Set 'Em Free
"River", by Labi Siffre from his self-titled debut album
"River", by King Trigger
"River", by Tom Gregory

Sports
River (poker), a nickname for the final card dealt in certain variations of poker
River, nickname of the football team of Club Atlético River Plate, Argentina
LJ Volley, an Italian women's volleyball club based in Modena 2013-2016
River Volley, an Italian women's volleyball club based in Piacenza

Other uses
River (typography), unattractive gaps appearing to run down a paragraph of text
Kimfly River, a Slovenian paraglider design
, the Android codename of the Motorola Moto G7 smartphone

See also
Rio (disambiguation)
Ríos (disambiguation)
Rive (disambiguation)
Rivers (disambiguation)
Rivier (disambiguation)
Rivière (disambiguation)
The River (disambiguation)

List of river films and television series

Unisex given names